Pan Am Flight 214 was a scheduled flight of Pan American World Airways from Isla Verde International Airport in San Juan, Puerto Rico, to Friendship Airport in Baltimore and Philadelphia International Airport. On December 8, 1963, the Boeing 707-121 serving the flight crashed near Elkton, Maryland, while flying from Baltimore to Philadelphia, after being hit by lightning. All 81 occupants of the plane were killed. The crash was Pan Am's first fatal accident with the 707, which it had introduced to its fleet five years earlier.

An investigation by the Civil Aeronautics Board concluded that the cause of the crash was a lightning strike that had ignited fuel vapors in one of the aircraft's fuel tanks, causing an explosion that destroyed one of the wings.  The exact manner of ignition was never determined, but the investigation yielded information about how lightning can damage aircraft, leading to new safety regulations.  The crash also spawned research into the safety of various types of aviation fuel and into methods of reducing dangerous fuel-tank vapors.

Accident
Pan Am Flight 214 was a regularly scheduled flight from Isla Verde International Airport in San Juan, Puerto Rico, to Philadelphia International Airport, with a scheduled stopover at Baltimore's Friendship Airport. It operated three times a week as the counterpart to Flight 213, which flew from Philadelphia to San Juan via Baltimore earlier the same day. Flight 214 left San Juan at 4:10pm. Eastern time with 140 passengers and eight crew members, and arrived in Baltimore at 7:10pm. The crew did not report any maintenance issues or problems during the flight. After 67 passengers disembarked in Baltimore, the aircraft departed at 8:24pm with its remaining 73 passengers for the final leg to Philadelphia International Airport.

As the flight approached Philadelphia, the pilots made radio contact with air traffic control near Philadelphia at 8:42pm. The controller informed the pilots that the airport was experiencing a line of thunderstorms in the vicinity, accompanied by strong winds and turbulence. The controller asked whether the pilots wanted to proceed directly to the airport or to enter a holding pattern to wait for the storm to pass. The controller told the pilots that the delay would last about 30minutes.

At 8:58pm, the aircraft exploded. The pilots were able to transmit a final message: "MAYDAY MAYDAY MAYDAY. Clipper 214 out of control. Here we go." Seconds later, the first officer of National Airlines Flight 16, holding  higher in the same holding pattern, radioed, "Clipper 214 is going down in flames." The aircraft crashed at 8:59pm in a corn field east of Elkton, Maryland, near the Delaware Turnpike, setting the rain-soaked field on fire. The aircraft was completely destroyed, and all of the occupants were killed.

The aircraft was the first Pan Am jet to crash in the five years since the company had introduced their jet fleet.

Aftermath

A Maryland state trooper who had been patrolling on Route 213 radioed an alert as he drove toward the crash site, east of Elkton near the state line. The trooper was first to arrive at the crash site and later stated, "It wasn’t a large fire. It was several smaller fires. A [portion of] fuselage with about 8 or 10 window frames was about the only large recognizable piece I could see when I pulled up. It was just a debris field. It didn’t resemble an airplane. The engines were buried in the ground  from the force of the impact."

Firefighters and police officers soon recognized that little could be done other than to extinguish the fires and to begin collecting bodies. The wreckage was engulfed in intense fires that burned for more than four hours. First responders and police from across the county, along with men from the United States Naval Training Center Bainbridge, assisted with the recovery. They patrolled the area with flares and set up searchlights to define the accident scene and to ensure that the debris and human remains were undisturbed by curious spectators.

Remains of the victims were brought to the National Guard Armory in Philadelphia, where a temporary morgue was created. Relatives came to the armory, but officials said it would not be possible to visually identify any of the victims. The state medical examiner needed nine days to complete identifications, using fingerprints, dental records, and nearby personal effects. In some cases, the team reconstructed the victims' faces to the extent possible using mannequins.

The main impact crater contained most of the aircraft's fuselage, the left inner wing, the left main gear, and the nose gear. Portions of the plane's right wing and fuselage, right main landing gear, horizontal and vertical tail surfaces, and two of the engines were found within  of the crater. Parts of the wreckage ripped a  hole in a country road, shattered windows in a nearby home, and spread burning jet fuel across a wide area. 

The Civil Aeronautics Board (CAB) was notified of the accident and was dispatched from Washington, D.C., to conduct an investigation. Witnesses of the crash described hearing the explosion and seeing the plane in flames as it descended. Of the 140 witnesses interviewed, 99 reported seeing an aircraft or a flaming object in the sky. Seven witnesses stated that they had seen lightning strike the aircraft. Seventy-two witnesses said that the ball of fire occurred at the same time as, or immediately after, the lightning strike. Twenty-three witnesses reported that the aircraft exploded after they had seen it ablaze.

Aircraft
The aircraft was a Boeing 707-121 registered with tail number N709PA. Named the Clipper Tradewind, it was the oldest aircraft in the U.S. commercial jet fleet at the time of the crash. It had been delivered to Pan Am on October 27, 1958, and had flown a total of 14,609 hours. It was powered by four Pratt & Whitney JT3C-6 turbojet engines, and its estimated value was $3,400,000.

In 1959, the aircraft had been involved in an incident in which the right outboard engine was torn from the wing during a training flight in France. The plane entered a sudden spin during a demonstration of the aircraft's minimum control speed, and the aerodynamic forces caused the engine to break away. The pilot regained control of the aircraft and landed safely in London using the remaining three engines. The detached engine fell into a field on a farm southwest of Paris, where the flight had originated, with no injuries.

Passengers and crew
The plane carried 73 passengers, who all died in the crash. All the passengers were residents of the United States.

The pilot was George F. Knuth, 45, of Long Island. He had flown for Pan Am for 22 years and had accumulated 17,049 hours of flying experience, including 2,890 in the Boeing 707. He had been involved in another incident in 1949 when, as pilot of Pan Am Flight 100, a Lockheed Constellation in flight over Port Washington, New York, a Cessna 140 single-engined airplane crashed into his plane. The two occupants of the Cessna were killed, but Captain Knuth was able to land safely with no injuries to his crew or passengers.

The first officer was John R. Dale, 48, also of Long Island. He had a total of 13,963 hours of flying time, of which 2,681 were in the Boeing 707. The second officer was Paul L. Orringer, age 42, of New Rochelle, New York. He had 10,008 hours of flying experience, including 2,808 in Boeing 707 aircraft. The flight engineer was John R. Kantlehner of Long Island. He had a total flying time of 6,066 hours, including 76 hours in the Boeing 707.

Investigation

The CAB assigned more than a dozen investigators within an hour of the crash. The CAB team was assisted by investigators from the Boeing Company, Pan Am, the Air Line Pilots Association, Pratt & Whitney, the Federal Bureau of Investigation, and the Federal Aviation Agency (FAA). The costs of the CAB's investigations rarely exceeded $10,000, but the agency would spend about $125,000 investigating this crash, not including the money spent by Boeing, the FAA, Pratt & Whitney, and other aircraft-part suppliers during additional investigations.

Initial theories of the cause of the crash focused on the possibility that the plane had experienced severe turbulence in flight that caused a fuel tank or fuel line to rupture, leading to an in-flight fire from leaking fuel. U.S. House Representative Samuel S. Stratton of Schenectady, New York, sent a telegram to the FAA urging them to restrict jet operations in turbulent weather, but the FAA responded that it saw no pattern that suggested the need for such restrictions, and Boeing concurred. Other theories included sabotage or lightning, but by nightfall after the first day, investigators had not found evidence of either. Some speculation arose that metal fatigue as a result of the aircraft's 1959 incident could be a factor, but the aircraft had undergone four separate maintenance overhauls since the accident without any issues having been detected.

Investigators rapidly located the flight data recorder, but it was badly damaged in the crash. Built to withstand an impact 100 times as strong as the force of gravity (g), it had been subjected to a force of 200 g, and its tape appeared to be hopelessly damaged. CAB chairman Alan S. Boyd told reporters shortly after the accident, "It was so compacted there is no way to tell at this time whether we can derive any useful information from it." Eventually, investigators were able to extract data from 95% of the tape that had been in the recorder.

The recovery of the wreckage took place over a period of 12 days, and 16 truckloads of the debris were taken to Bolling Air Force Base in Washington, DC, for investigators to examine and reassemble. Investigators revealed that a fire had occurred in flight, and one commented that it was nearly certain that an in-flight explosion of some kind had occurred. Eyewitness testimony later confirmed that the plane had been burning on its way down to the crash site.

Within days, investigators reported that the crash had apparently been caused by an explosion that had blown off one of the wing tips. Investigators revealed that rough turbulence was unlikely to have caused the crash because the crews of other aircraft that had been circling in the area reported that the air was relatively smooth at the time. They also said that the plane would have had to dive a considerable distance before aerodynamic forces would have caused it to break up and explode, but the aircraft apparently had caught fire close to its cruising altitude of 5,000 feet.

Before this flight, lightning had not been known to cause a plane to crash, despite many instances of planes being struck. Typically, an airplane is struck by lightning once or twice a year in normal operations. Scientists and airline industry representatives vigorously disputed the theory that lightning could have caused the aircraft to explode, calling it improbable. The closest example of such an instance occurred near Milan, Italy in June 1959, when a Lockheed L-1049 Super Constellation crashed as a result of static electricity igniting fuel vapor emanating from the fuel vents. Despite the opposition, investigators found multiple lightning strike marks on the left wing tip, and a large area of damage that extended along the rear edge of the wing, leading investigators to conclude that lightning was indeed the cause. The CAB launched an urgent research program in an attempt to identify conditions in which fuel vapors in the wings could have been ignited by lightning. Within a week of the crash, the FAA issued an order requiring the installation of static electricity dischargers on the approximately 100 Boeing jet airliners that had not already been so equipped. Aviation industry representatives were critical of the order, countering that there was no evidence that the dischargers would have any beneficial effect since they were not designed to handle the effects of lightning. They said that the order would create a false impression that the risk of lightning strikes had been resolved.

The CAB conducted a public hearing in Philadelphia in February 1964 as part of its investigation. Experts had still not concluded that lightning had caused the accident, but they were investigating how lightning could have triggered the explosion. The FAA said that it would conduct research to determine the relative safety of the two types of jet fuel used in the United States, both of which were present in the fuel tanks of Flight 214. Criticism of the JP-4 jet fuel that was in the tanks centered around the fact that its vapors can be easily ignited at the low temperatures encountered in flight. JP-4 advocates countered that the fuel was as safe, or safer than, kerosene, the other fuel used in jets at the time.

Pan Am conducted a flight test in a Boeing 707 to investigate whether fuel could leak from the tank-venting system during a test flight that attempted to simulate moderate to rough turbulence in flight. The test did not reveal any fuel discharge, but some evidence showed that fuel had entered the vent system, collected in the surge tanks, and returned to the tanks. Pan Am said that it would test a new system to inject inert gas into the air spaces above the fuel tanks in aircraft in an attempt to reduce the risk of hazardous fuel-air mixtures that could ignite.

On March 3, 1965, the CAB released its final accident report. The investigators concluded that a lightning strike had ignited the fuel-air mixture in the number-one reserve fuel tank, which had caused an explosive disintegration of the left outer wing, leading to a loss of control. Despite one of the most intensive research efforts in its history, the agency could not identify the exact mechanics of the fuel ignition, concluding that lightning had ignited vapors through an as-yet unknown pathway. The board said, "It is felt that the current state of the art does not permit an extension of test results to unqualified conclusions of all aspects of natural lightning effects.  The need for additional research is recognized and additional programming is planned."

Legacy

The crash of Pan Am Flight 214 called attention to previously unknown risks to aircraft from lightning strikes. One month after the crash, the FAA formed a technical committee on lightning protection for fuel systems, including experts from the FAA, CAB, other government agencies and lightning experts. The committee agreed to conduct both long-range and short-range studies of the impact of lightning on aircraft fuel systems, and potential measures to defeat such hazards. In 1967, the FAA updated airworthiness standards for transport-category airplanes with requirements that fuel systems must be designed to prevent the ignition of fuel vapor within the system by lightning strikes, and published guidance related to that requirement. Additional requirements to protect the aircraft from lightning were enacted in 1970.

Many aircraft-design improvements emerged as a result of the new guidelines and regulations. New regulations mandated the electrical bonding between the surface of the aircraft and any items that are installed on the surface of the wings near the tanks, such as fuel filler caps, drain valves, and access panels. Fuel-vent flame arrestors were added to aircraft to detect and discharge fire suppressant to extinguish fuel vapors that ignite at fuel-vent outlets. Passive flame arrestors were also added to internal vent pipes to help extinguish any flames that make it past the first stage arrestors.  The thickness of the aluminum surfaces of aircraft wings was increased to reduce the potential for lightning to completely melt through a wing surface into the wing's internal components.

See also

LANSA Flight 508 – Another accident caused by a lightning strike
TWA Flight 800 – Aircraft accident caused by ignition of fuel vapors

References

External links

A Pan American promotional film that features Clipper Tradewind (N709PA)
A picture of the aircraft involved in the accident (archived from the original on November 4, 2012)
Another photograph of the aircraft involved

Accidents and incidents involving the Boeing 707
Airliner accidents and incidents caused by lightning strikes
Airliner accidents and incidents in Maryland
Airliner accidents and incidents involving in-flight explosions
Aviation accidents and incidents in the United States in 1963
Elkton, Maryland
214
1963 in Maryland
1963 meteorology
December 1963 events in the United States